Moses Ransom Doyon was mayor of Madison, Wisconsin.

Biography
Doyon was born on December 18, 1845, in Franklin, Vermont. He married Amelia Herrick on October 19, 1869. Doyon moved to Ironton, Wisconsin, in 1878. He moved to Madison in 1881. Doyon died on August 12, 1933.

His former home, known as the William T. Leitch House, is listed on the National Register of Historic Places. The house was also home to Madison Mayor William T. Leitch and U.S. Representative Nils P. Haugen.

Career
Doyon was mayor from 1888 to 1890. He was elected in 1888 and reelected in 1889 as candidate of all political parties. Previously, he was a member of Board of Education of Madison.

References

People from Franklin, Vermont
People from Sauk County, Wisconsin
Mayors of Madison, Wisconsin
1845 births
Wisconsin Democrats
Wisconsin Republicans
1933 deaths